is a railway station on the Osaka Loop Line in Tennōji-ku, Osaka, Japan, operated by West Japan Railway Company (JR West).

Station layout
The station has two elevated side platforms, serving two tracks.

Platforms

Adjacent stations

History
The station opened on 16 July 1932. Following the privatization of Japanese National Railways (JNR) on 1 April 1987, the station came under the control of JR West.

In August 2015, an old station sign painted directly on the wall and dating from the 1930s or 1940s was uncovered during renovation work, and this was subsequently preserved.

Station numbering was introduced in March 2018 with Teradacho being assigned station number JR-O02.

Surrounding area
Ikuno Shopping Arcade
Osaka Kyoiku University Tennōji Junior High School, Osaka Kyoiku University High School Tennōji
Osaka Ikuno Technical High School
Kokoku High School
Clark Memorial International High School

Bus services
Buses operate from the "Teradachō-ekimae" bus stop by Osaka Municipal Transportation Bureau.

See also
 List of railway stations in Japan

References

External links

  

Ikuno-ku, Osaka
Railway stations in Osaka
Osaka Loop Line
Railway stations in Japan opened in 1932
Stations of West Japan Railway Company